World Series of Fighting 31: Ivanov vs. Copeland was a mixed martial arts event held on  at the Foxwoods Resort Casino in Mashantucket, Connecticut.

Background
The event was headlined by a WSOF Heavyweight Championship fight between champion Blagoy Ivanov and Josh Copeland. The co-main event was a battle between UFC veterans Jason High and Mike Ricci.

Results

See also
List of WSOF events
List of WSOF champions

References

World Series of Fighting events
2016 in mixed martial arts